Edward Wilmot Blyden (3 August 1832 – 7 February 1912) was a Liberian educator, writer, diplomat, and politician who was primarily active in West Africa. Born in the Danish West Indies, he joined the waves of black immigrants from the Americas who migrated to the country. Blyden became a teacher for five years in the British West African colony of Sierra Leone in the early twentieth century. His writings on pan-Africanism became influential throughout West Africa, attracting attention in countries such as the United States as well. He believed that Zionism was a model for what he termed Ethiopianism, and that African Americans could return to Africa and help in the rebuilding of the continent.

Blyden was recognised in his youth for his talents and drive; he was educated and mentored by John Knox, an American Protestant minister in Sankt Thomas who encouraged him to continue his education in the United States. In 1850 Blyden was refused admission to three Northern theological seminaries because of his race. Knox encouraged him to go to Liberia, a colony set up for free people of color by the American Colonization Society. Blyden emigrated in 1850 and made his career and life there. He married into a prominent family and soon started working as a journalist. Blyden's ideas remain influential to this day.

Early life and education
Blyden was born on 3 August 1832 in Sankt Thomas, Danish West Indies (now known as the American Virgin Islands), to free black parents who claimed descent from the Igbo people of present-day Nigeria. Between 1842 and 1845 the family lived in Porto Bello, Venezuela, where Blyden discovered a facility for languages, becoming fluent in Spanish.

According to the historian Hollis R. Lynch, in 1845 Blyden met the Reverend John P. Knox, a white American, who became pastor of the St. Thomas Protestant Dutch Reformed Church. Blyden and his family lived near the church, and Knox was impressed with the studious, intelligent boy. Knox became his mentor, encouraging Blyden's considerable aptitude for oratory and literature. Mainly because of his close association with Knox, the young Blyden decided to become a minister, which his parents encouraged.

In May 1850, Blyden, accompanied by Reverend Knox's wife, went to the United States to enroll in Rutgers Theological College, Knox's alma mater. He was refused admission due to his race. Efforts to enroll him in two other theological colleges also failed. Knox encouraged Blyden to go to Liberia, the colony set up in the 1830s by the American Colonization Society (ACS) in West Africa, where he thought Blyden would be able to use his talents. Later in 1850, Blyden sailed to Liberia. He soon became deeply involved in its development.

Starting in 1860, Blyden corresponded with William Ewart Gladstone, who would later become a significant Liberal leader and Prime Minister of the United Kingdom. Gladstone offered Blyden an opportunity to study in England in 1861, but Blyden declined due to his obligations in Liberia.

Marriage, family and legacy

Blyden married Sarah Yates, an Americo-Liberian from the prominent Yates family. She was the daughter of Hilary Yates and his wife. Her paternal uncle, Beverly Page Yates, served as vice-president of Liberia from 1856 to 1860 under President Stephen Allen Benson.  Blyden and Sarah had three children together.

Later, while living for several years in Freetown, Sierra Leone, Blyden had a long-term relationship with Anna Erskine, a Liberian woman from Clay-Ashland who had moved to Freetown in 1877. She was a granddaughter of James Spriggs-Payne, who was twice elected as the President of Liberia. Blyden and Erskine had five children together. In the 21st century, many Blyden descendants living in Sierra Leone identify as part of the Krio population. Among these descendants is Sylvia Blyden, publisher of the Awareness Times.

Blyden died on 7 February 1912 in Freetown, Sierra Leone, where he was buried at Racecourse Cemetery. In honour of him, the 20th-century Pan-Africanist George Padmore named his daughter Blyden.

Career
Emigrating to Liberia in 1850 Blyden was soon working in journalism. From 1855 to 1856 he edited the Liberia Herald and wrote the column "A Voice From Bleeding Africa". He also spent time in British colonies in West Africa, particularly Nigeria and Sierra Leone, writing for early newspapers in both colonies. He also served as editor at The Negro and The African World. He maintained ties with the American Colonization Society and published in their African Repository and Colonial Journal.

In 1861 Blyden became professor of Greek and Latin at Liberia College. He was selected as president of the college, serving 1880–1884 during a period of expansion.

As a diplomat Blyden served as an ambassador for Liberia to Britain and France. He also traveled to the United States where he spoke to major black churches about his work in Africa. Blyden believed that Black Americans could end their suffering of racial discrimination by returning to Africa and helping to develop it. He was criticized by African Americans who wanted to gain full civil rights in their birth nation of the United States and did not identify with Africa.

In suggesting a redemptive role for African Americans in Africa through what he called Ethiopianism, Blyden likened their suffering in the diaspora to that of the Jews; he supported the 19th-century Zionist project of Jews returning to Palestine. In their book Israel in the Black American Perspective, Robert G. Weisbord and Richard Kazarian write that in his booklet The Jewish Question (published in 1898, the year after the First Zionist Congress) Blyden describes that while travelling in the Middle East in 1866 he wanted to travel to "the original home of the Jews--to see Jerusalem and Mt. Zion, the joy of the whole earth". While in Jerusalem he visited the Western Wall. Blyden advocated for the Jewish settlement of Palestine and chided Jews for not taking advantage of the opportunity to live in their ancient homeland. Blyden was familiar with Theodor Herzl and his book The Jewish State, praising it for expressing ideas that "have given such an impetus to the real work of the Jews as will tell with enormous effect upon their future history".

Later in life Blyden became involved in Islam and concluded that it was a more "African" religion than Christianity for African Americans and Americo-Liberians.

Participating in the development of the country, Blyden was appointed the Liberian Secretary of State (1862–64). He was later appointed as Secretary of the Interior (1880–82). Blyden contested the 1885 presidential election for the Republican Party, but lost to incumbent Hilary R. W. Johnson.

From 1901 to 1906, Blyden directed the education of Sierra Leonean Muslims at an institution in Sierra Leone where he lived in Freetown. This is when he had his relationship with Anna Erskine; they had five children together. He became passionate about Islam during this period, recommending it to African Americans as the major religion most in keeping with their historic roots in Africa.

Writings

As a writer, Blyden has been regarded by some as the "father of Pan-Africanism" and is noted as one of the first people to articulate a notion of "African Personality" and the uniqueness of the "African race". His ideas have influenced many twentieth-century figures including Marcus Garvey, George Padmore and Kwame Nkrumah. His major work, Christianity, Islam and the Negro Race (1887), promoted the idea that practicing Islam was more unifying and fulfilling for Africans than Christianity. Blyden believed that practicing Christianity had a demoralizing effect on Africans, although he continued to be a Christian. He thought Islam was more authentically African, as it had been brought to Sub-Saharan areas by people from North Africa.

His book quickly became controversial. At first many people did not believe that an African had written it; his promotion of Islam was disputed. In later printings, Blyden included his photograph as the frontispiece.

His book included the following:

Let us do away with the sentiment of Race. Let us do away with out African personality and be lost, if possible, in another Race.' This is as wise or as philosophical as to say, let us do away with gravitation, with heat and cold and sunshine and rain. Of course, the Race in which these persons would be absorbed is the dominant race, before which, in cringing self-surrender and ignoble self-suppression they lie in prostrate admiration.

Due to his belief in Ethiopianism, in the late 19th century Blyden publicly supported the creation of a Jewish state in Israel, praising Theodor Herzl as the creator of "that marvelous movement called Zionism".

Works

Books
 Call of Providence to the Descendants of Africa in America", A Discourse Delivered to Coloured Congregations in the Cities of New York, Philadelphia, Baltimore, Harrisburg, during the Summer of 1862, in Liberia's Offering: Being Addresses, Sermons, etc., New York: John A. Gray, 1862.
Christianity, Islam and the Negro Race, London, W. B. Whittingham & Co., 1887; 2nd edition 1888; University of Edinburgh Press, 3rd edition, 1967; reprint of 1888 edition, Baltimore, Maryland: Black Classic Press, 1994 (edition on Googlebooks).
 African Life and Customs, London: C. M. Phillips, 1908; reprint Baltimore, Maryland: Black Classic Press, 1994.
 West Africa Before Europe: and Other Addresses, Delivered in England in 1901 and 1903, London: C. M. Phillips, 1905.

Essays and speeches
 "Africa for the Africans", African Repository and Colonial Journal, Washington, DC: January 1872.
 "The Call of Providence to the Descendants of Africa in America", A Discourse Delivered to Coloured Congregations in the Cities of New York, Philadelphia, Baltimore, Harrisburg, during the Summer of 1862, in Liberia's Offering: Being Addresses, Sermons, etc., New York: John A. Gray, 1862.
 "The Elements of Permanent Influence", Discourse Delivered at the 15th St. Presbyterian Church, Washington, DC, Sunday, 16 February 1890, Washington, DC: R. L. Pendleton (published by request), 1890 (hosted on Virtual Museum of Edward W. Blyden).
 "Liberia as a Means, Not an End", Liberian Independence Oration: 26 July 1867; African Repository and Colonial Journal, Washington, DC: November 1867.
 "The Negro in Ancient History, Liberia: Past, Present, and Future", Methodist Quarterly Review, Washington, DC: M'Gill & Witherow Printer.
 "The Origin and Purpose of African Colonization", A Discourse Delivered at the 66th Anniversary of the American Colonization Society, Washington, DC, 14 January 1883, Washington, 1883.
 E. W. Blyden M.A., Report on the Falaba Expedition 1872, Addressed to His Excellency Governor J. Pope Hennessy, C.M.G., Published by authority Freetown, Sierra Leone. Printed at Government Office, 1872.
 "Liberia at the American Centennial", Methodist Quarterly Review, July 1877.
 "America in Africa," Christian Advocate I, 28 July 1898, II, 4 August 1898.
 "The Negro in the United States", A.M.E. Church Review, January 1900.

See also

Pan-Africanism

References

External links

African Repository and Colonial Journal, Internet Archive, issues online

1832 births
1912 deaths
19th-century Liberian writers
20th-century Liberian writers
Americo-Liberian people
Americo-Liberians of Igbo descent
Classics educators
English-language writers
Foreign Ministers of Liberia
Interior ministers of Liberia
Liberian Christians
Liberian pan-Africanists
Liberian writers
People from Saint Thomas, U.S. Virgin Islands
People from colonial Nigeria
Presidents of the University of Liberia
Secretaries of the Interior (Liberia)
Sierra Leone Creole people
Sierra Leonean academics
Sierra Leonean Christians
Sierra Leonean pan-Africanists
Academic staff of the University of Liberia